Mary de Cervellione (Mary of Cervellon) (1230 at Barcelona – 19 September 1290) was a Catalan superior of a Third Order of Mercedarians. She is a Catholic saint; her following, which began immediately after her death, was approved by Pope Innocent XII in 1692.

She is invoked especially against shipwreck and is generally represented with a ship in her hand. Her feast is celebrated on 19 September. On account of her charity towards the needy she began to be called Maria de Socos (Mary of Help).

Life
Born at Barcelona, she was the daughter of a Spanish nobleman named William de Cervellon. She was baptized on December 8 in Santa Maria del Mar. Mary de Cervellione assisted at the Hospital of Saint Eulalia, which had been built largely through the generosity of Raimundo de Plagamans, a wealthy businessman in the royal service; and was located at Villanova by the sea.

The Mercedarians had for time been involved in redeeming Christian slaves and captives held by the Saracens of Spain and North Africa. Through her work at the hospital, Mary came into contact with Peter Nolasco, founder of the Merdearians. One day she heard a sermon preached by Bernardo de Corbera, the superior of the Brotherhood of Our Lady of Ransom at Barcelona, and was so deeply affected that she resolved to do all in her power for those held captive. Despite her families repeated attempts to arrange a socially advantageous marriage, with the assistance of Bernabo, in 1265 she joined a little community of pious women who lived near the monastery of the Mercedarians and spent their lives in prayer and good works.

They obtained permission to constitute a Third Order of Our Lady of Ransom (de Mercede) and to wear the habit of the Brotherhood of Our Lady of Ransom. In addition to the usual vows of tertiaries, they promised to pray for the Christian slaves. Mary was elected the first superior.

Although the sisters devoted themselves to prayer, they were not a contemplative order. Mary de Cervellione continued to work at Saint Eulalia's, where the ransomed stayed once they returned. Because of her devotion to the poor and those in need she was called "Maria de Socos" (Mary of Help). She was credited, both before and after her death, with coming to the aid of ships in danger at sea so they might continue on course to safely deliver Christian prisoners. 

She died on September 19, 1290.

Veneration
Her cult was approved by Pope Innocent XII in 1692. Her remains lie in the Basilica of La Merced in Barcelona. She is depicted as holding a ship.

References

Attribution
 The entry cites:
Acta Sanctorum, September, VII, 152–171;
DUNBAR, Dictionary of Saintly Women II (London, 1905), 56–7;
CORBERA, Vida y hechos maravillo sas de d. Maria de Cerveilon, clamado Maria Socos (Barcelona, 1639): a Life written by her contemporary John de Laes is printed in Acta Sanctorum. According to Sarah Fawcett Thomas, Paul Burns, Butler's Lives of the Saints, September (2000), p. 186, these accounts are marred by many forgeries.

1290 deaths
Mercedarian saints
13th-century Christian saints
Year of birth uncertain
Spanish Roman Catholic saints
Female saints of medieval Spain
Medieval Spanish saints
People from Barcelona
13th-century Spanish women
13th-century Catalan people
1230 births
Canonizations by Pope Innocent XII